Peter Eugene McCullough is Sohmer Fellow, and head of English literature at Lincoln College, Oxford University. He specializes in Early Modern Religious writing, particularly that of Lancelot Andrewes and John Donne. He is Lay Canon (History) at St Paul's Cathedral, London.

Education
Born and raised in northern California, McCullough attended Nevada Union High School in Grass Valley, California. He earned his first degree in 1987 from UCLA, followed by a PhD (1992) and two years of post-doctoral teaching at Princeton University (1994–97). He was a Junior Research Fellow at Trinity College, Oxford, and taught various classes and tutorials on the topics of English Literature from 1509-1642 and English Literature from 1642-1740. His undergraduate degree was from the UCLA and he earned his PhD from Princeton University.

Work
Following his PhD, he took a Junior Research Fellowship at Trinity College, Oxford, in 1994. Afterwards, he received a Fellowship from Lincoln College for teaching and research where he remains. His work appeared in the Huntington Library Quarterly.

He is currently chief editor and contributor for a 14 volume work on John Donne.

Personal
McCullough lives in Oxford, England, with his partner.

Bibliography

Reviews

References

External links
 Stpauls.co.uk
 Stpauls.co.uk

American expatriate academics
American expatriates in the United Kingdom
Fellows of Lincoln College, Oxford
Princeton University alumni
University of California, Los Angeles alumni
Living people
Place of birth missing (living people)
Year of birth missing (living people)